Worsbrough is a ward in the metropolitan borough of Barnsley, South Yorkshire, England.  The ward contains 46 listed buildings that are recorded in the National Heritage List for England.  Of these, one is listed at Grade I, the highest of the three grades, four are at Grade II*, the middle grade, and the others are at Grade II, the lowest grade.  The ward contains a central urban area and surrounding countryside.  Most of the listed buildings are houses, cottages and associated structures, farmhouses and farm buildings.  The other listed buildings include churches and items in a churchyard, a former school, a former corn mill, now a museum, a carved outcrop of sandstone, a bridge, a milepost, and a monument to a colliery disaster.


Key

Buildings

References

Citations

Sources

 

Lists of listed buildings in South Yorkshire
Buildings and structures in the Metropolitan Borough of Barnsley